The Bissau Palace Hotel, Jaipur is a heritage hotel in Jaipur, in India. Built in the 19th century, it was the palace of Raghubir Singhji, a royal nobleman. It is located just outside the walls of the old city of Jaipur, a short distance to the north of Chand Pol (an entrance gate to the old city).

History
Built in the 19th century during the reign of Maharaja Sawai Jagat Singh (1803–18), the structure originally served as a palace of the nobleman Rawal Raja Raghubir Singhji. The Shekhawati estate was home to the rawals of Bissau. The palace was converted to a hotel in 1965. Now a heritage hotel, it is situated in Jaipur's old bazaar area.

Architecture and fittings
Bissau Palace Hotel has a curved entry facade, and the enclosed area within the palace displays checkerboard patterned flooring, while the lounge has wooden floors. There are 36 rooms, some of which have unique bed fittings and ornamentation, including antique furnishings and artifacts. Over the fireplace in the palace hangs a painting of the Maharaja of Bissau with his courtiers. Also seen on the walls of the palace are swords that were used during encounters with Muslims. Next to the sitting room is a wood-paneled library filled with old books. Along with exhibits of typical artifacts of Rajasthan, there are many showcases containing jewelry, weapons, sculptures of elephants, vases, and photographs – including a tiger shikar scene and Lord Mountbatten visiting the royal family of Bissau. The hotel has three restaurants, including one on the rooftop, and presents Rajasthani folk dancers during buffet dinners.

Grounds
Bissau Palace Hotel is reached via a circular entry way. A well-tended garden, housed with many species of birds, is part of the grounds. Among the other facilities are a swimming pool and tennis courts.

References

Bibliography

 

Hotels in Jaipur
Palaces in Rajasthan
Royal residences in India
Hotels in Rajasthan
Heritage hotels in India
Rajput architecture
Buildings and structures in Jaipur
Palaces in Jaipur